Jake Nordin (born July 8, 1984) is a former American football tight end. He was signed by the New England Patriots as an undrafted free agent in 2007. He played college football at Northern Illinois.

External links
Just Sports Stats
Detroit Lions bio
New England Patriots bio
Northern Illinois Huskies bio

1984 births
Living people
People from Kandiyohi County, Minnesota
Players of American football from Minnesota
American football tight ends
American football fullbacks
Northern Illinois Huskies football players
New England Patriots players
Washington Redskins players
New York Giants players
Baltimore Ravens players
Detroit Lions players
Minnesota Vikings players
Las Vegas Locomotives players